Easy 2 Hate is a full-length 2-disc album released by Haystak on November 30, 2010. The album peaked at 68 on the Billboard Top R&B/Hip-Hop Albums chart, and 12 on the Heatseekers Albums chart.

Track listing
Disc 1
 "Been A Long Time" - 3:33
 "My People An Em'" - 4:22
 "King Round Here" - 4:51
 "Everybody Eats" - 3:48
 "Swag" - 4:42
 "Big White Whirlwind" - 4:13
 "I Be Listenin'" - 4:28
 "Blastville, Pt. 2" - 4:29
 "Ya Best Bet" - 4:20
 "Those People" - 4:24
 "Confrontational" - 4:09
 "See Me In The Streets" - 4:49
 "Flag Folded" - 4:23
 "They Ain't Sayin' Nothin'" - 3:17
 "Fuck Up And Find Out" - 4:04
Disc 2
 "Good To The Game" - 2:43
 "One Time" - 5:16
 "My Baby" - 5:47
 "More Like Our Children" - 4:49
 "Funny Bout You" - 4:18
 "Too Much Love" - 5:47
 "Please Baby" - 4:23
 "Silver Spoon" - 5:10
 "So What?" - 4:31
 "Stop Talkin'" - 4:17
 "Keep Bubblin'" - 4:13
 "Worst Case Scenario" - 4:19
 "Bottom Brawd" - 4:30
 "The Band Played On" - 4:47
 "Beginnin' Of An Era" - 6:03

References

External links
https://itunes.apple.com/us/album/easy-2-hate/id399415350
https://www.amazon.com/Easy-2-Hate-Haystak/dp/B0047BXR7Q
http://www.bestbuy.com/site/Easy-2-Hate---CD/1531358.p?id=2165141&skuId=1531358
http://www.cduniverse.com/productinfo.asp?pid=8360679
http://www.allmusic.com/album/easy-2-hate-mw0002071865

Haystak albums
2010 albums